"Leavin'" is a song by American singer-songwriter Jesse McCartney, released as the lead single from McCartney's third studio album Departure (2008).  Written and produced by Tricky Stewart and The-Dream, with additional writing by James Bunton and Corron Ty Cole, "Leavin'" was sent to U.S. mainstream radios on March 10, 2008.

"Leavin'" was considered a departure from Jesse's young image, having a more adult topic and sound. Lyrically, the song sees Jesse eyeing a female's backside with plans to steal her from her current beau. Sonically, the song is pop with an electro production style and sound effects from digital watches, alarm clocks and kitchen timers. Its music video shows the singer admiring a model before kissing her at the end.

"Leavin'" is McCartney's biggest hit single in the United States to date, receiving huge radio and mainstream play, reaching number one on the Billboard Top 40 Mainstream and the top-ten on the Billboard Hot 100, selling over 2 million digital downloads, and being certified Platinum by Recording Industry Association of America (RIAA).

Background and release 
After achieving a younger audience with his first two albums, Beautiful Soul (2004) and Right Where You Want Me (2006), Jesse McCartney announced that his third studio album "gonna be a shock to a lot of people," saying: "Sonically, it will sound like a 2007 record but with that '80s bigness to it. People won't even realize who is singing some of these songs." He also revealed that the album is "certainly a little bit more urban-influenced, I worked with people really well known in that area of music, they gonna see a lot of growth, obviously with the first single."

"Leavin'" was first released on radio, on March 10, 2008. Later, the single was released on  April 22, 2008, following the UK release on June 9, 2008. On August 26, 2008, an acoustic version of the song was made available on iTunes and other outlets. The acoustic version was sung by McCartney with Rich Berra of the Johnjay and Rich Morning Show, a radio show broadcast across Arizona, Portland and Colorado Springs. Proceeds from the downloads benefitted the radio duo's Christmas Wish Foundation or CWF.

Composition 
"Leavin'" was written and produced by Christopher "Tricky" Stewart and The-Dream, while James Button and Corron Ty Cole co-wrote the track and Kuk Harrell produced McCartney's vocals. The song is considered a departure from McCartney's old style of teen pop, with a more urban-influenced sound. "Leavin'" is a pop song, with electro production. Written in the key of A major, it has a tempo of 79.255 beats per minute, with McCartney's vocals spanning from the low-note of E4 to the high-note of C6. Lyrically, "Leavin'" sees the singer eyeing a female's backside with plans to steal her from her current beau.

The song starts with stabbing, near-industrial beats. Radio Disney played the song with a few edits, changing the line, "Man, that thing you got behind you is amazin'" to "Man, the way you make me feel is so amazing", and "take you out and let it rain" to "turn around and look again". It is featured on Radio Disney Jams, Vol. 11.

Critical reception 
"Leavin'" received generally favorable reviews from music critics.  Nick Levine of Digital Spy gave the song 4 out of 5 stars, writing that 'Leavin' "is the musical equivalent of McCartney's first tuft of chest hair, a hard-edged crunk gem that wouldn't sound out of place on an Usher or Chris Brown album. Combining smooth, radio-friendly choruses with trendy electro production from Tricky and The Dream, it makes McCartney sound fresh and a little bit sexy without scaring off the milk 'n' cookies brigade."

Stephen Thomas Erlewine of Allmusic picked the song as a standout track on Departure. Gian F. of The Muse's Muse praised the track, writing that "it gives you a glimpse into the more refined, confident, and aggressive Jesse who showcases increased ranged and improved vocal agility." Alex Macpherson of The Guardian called it a "sharp crunk song with fantastic hook." However, Graham Drummond of Click Music called it "over-produced and lacking any lyrical value."

Music video
Tommy2 confirmed that the music video for "Leavin" was shot on February 17, 2008, and was directed by Sanji, who also directed his "She's No You" video. The video premiered on March 7, 2008.

It begins with Jesse and a lady played by the actress Niki Huey sitting in the chairs opposite each other. Jesse is wearing an unbuttoned shirt and she is wearing a long-sleeved shirt and panties. After staring at each other, Niki gets up and climbs suggestively onto Jesse's lap. The second verse has Jesse wearing only pants and Niki is wearing a bra and underwear, rolling around, frolicking on a mattress. The video ends with Jesse and Niki are kissing in the car. Throughout the chorus, Jesse is shown in a bluish-white room.

Formats and track listings
Australian CD - single
 "Leavin'"  (Single Version)
 "Leavin'" (The Bimbo Jones Radio Edit)
 "Leavin'" (MSTRKRFT Remix)

EU iTunes Download 1 - EP
 "Leavin'" (Radio Edit)
 "Oxygen"
 "Think About It"

EU iTunes Download 2 - Single
 "Leavin" (Album Version)
 "Bleeding Love"

EU iTunes Download 3 - Single
 "Leavin" (Radio Edit)
 "Leavin" (The Bimbo Jones Radio Edit)

UK CD - Single
 "Leavin'"
 "Leavin'" (The Bimbo Jones Radio Edit)

UK iTunes Download 1 - Single
 "Leavin'" (Radio Edit)
 "Leavin'" (MSTRKRFT Remix)

UK iTunes Download 2 - Single
 "Leavin'" (The Bimbo Jones Radio Edit)

UK iTunes Download 3 - EP
 "Leavin'" (Radio Edit)
 "Bleeding Love"
 "Leavin'" (Ralph Rosario Radio Edit)
 "Leavin'" (Albert C Reggaeton Radio Mix)

UK iTunes Download 4 - EP
 "Leavin'"(Album Version)
 "Leavin'" (MSTRKRFT Remix)
 "Leavin'" (Video Download)

Chart performance
"Leavin'" debuted at number 14 on the Billboard Hot 100 chart of May 10, 2008, making it McCartney's highest debut on the chart and highest charting-single of his career. In its second week, the song rose to number 10, becoming his first and only top-ten hit in the United States to date.
It stayed at its peak position for three non-consecutive weeks. The song managed to top the Hot Rap Songs chart; his first and only number-one and second top-ten single. On the now-defunct Billboard Pop 100, the song peaked at number 2, while it also topped the Hot Dance Club Songs chart. "Leavin'" also managed to peak at number-one (remaining at the top for six consecutive weeks) on American Top 40 hosted by Ryan Seacrest. "Leavin'" holds the record for spending the second most weeks at No. 1 in 2008 on the American Top 40 behind Leona Lewis' "Bleeding Love" which was also co-written by Jesse McCartney.

Elsewhere, "Leavin'" charted very moderately, only reaching the top-twenty in Canada. In France, "Leavin'" peaked at number 32, while in Australia, it debuted and peaked at number 49, remaining on the ARIA Charts only for one week, becoming his lowest charting-single there. In the United Kingdom, it reached number 48 on the Official Charts Company, while in Netherlands, it performed poorly at number 97.

Charts

Weekly charts

Year-end charts

All-time charts

Certifications

References

External links
 Jesse McCartney's official website
 "Leavin'" official music video

2008 singles
2008 songs
Jesse McCartney songs
Hollywood Records singles
Music videos directed by Sanji (director)
Song recordings produced by Kuk Harrell
Song recordings produced by Tricky Stewart
Songs written by The-Dream
Songs written by Tricky Stewart